Charles Johnston Badger (August 6, 1853 – September 7, 1932) was an admiral in the United States Navy. His active-duty career included service in the Spanish–American War and World War I.

Early life and education
The son of Commodore Oscar C. Badger (1823–1899), Charles Badger was born August 6, 1853 in Rockville, Maryland. He attended the United States Naval Academy, graduating in 1873.

Career
Badger served on the USS Cincinnati (C-7) during the Spanish–American War, and climaxed his career as Commander in Chief, Atlantic Fleet. He served as superintendent of the United States Naval Academy from 1907 to 1909.

He was promoted to rear admiral on March 8, 1911.

He was an hereditary companion of the Military Order of the Loyal Legion of the United States as well as a member of the District of Columbia Society of the Sons of the American Revolution.

During the Tampico Affair, Vice Admiral Badger commanded the Atlantic Fleet.

Family
Badger married Sophia Jane Champlin (1860–1923) and had two children. 

Their daughter was Elizabeth Champlin Badger (b. 1883), who married Captain H. F. Bryan, USN.  They had three children.

Their son was Oscar Charles Badger II (1890–1958) who received the Medal of Honor for heroism at Vera Cruz in 1914 and went on to serve in both world wars.  He retired from the Navy as an admiral in 1952.

Rear Admiral Badger was a cousin of Secretary of the Navy George E. Badger (1790–1865).

Awards
 Navy Distinguished Service Medal
 Sampson Medal
 Spanish Campaign Medal
 World War I Victory Medal

Death and legacy
Rear Admiral Badger died September 7, 1932 and is buried in Arlington National Cemetery.

See also

 List of Superintendents of the United States Naval Academy

References

1853 births
1932 deaths
People from Rockville, Maryland
United States Navy rear admirals (upper half)
United States Naval Academy alumni
American military personnel of the Spanish–American War
United States Navy personnel of World War I
Burials at Arlington National Cemetery
Recipients of the Navy Distinguished Service Medal
Superintendents of the United States Naval Academy